Cochylimorpha amabilis is a species of moth of the family Tortricidae. It is found in China (Xizang) and Japan.

References

Moths described in 1931
Cochylimorpha
Moths of Asia
Moths of Japan